Ange-Marie Aubry (19 August 1890 – 6 January 1969) was a French racing cyclist. He rode in the 1920 Tour de France.

References

1890 births
1969 deaths
French male cyclists
Place of birth missing